Emam Abdollah (also Romanized as Emām ‘Abdollāh; also known as Emāmzādeh ‘Abdollāh) is a village in Chehel Chay Rural District, in the Central District of Minudasht County, Golestan Province, Iran. At the 2006 census, its population was 241, in 81 families.

References 

Populated places in Minudasht County